Spring Reunion is a 1956 American drama film that centers on the fifteen-year reunion of the fictional Carson High School class of 1941. It was the second film produced by Kirk Douglas' film production company Bryna Productions.

Spring Reunion was a screen comeback for actress Betty Hutton, her first film in five years since her departure from Paramount Studios in 1952, after the completion of the musical Somebody Loves Me. Although Hutton's performance was praised by several critics, the film generated little interest and failed at the box office. It was Hutton's last feature film. The film opened at the Astoria Theatre in London, England in late December 1956.

Plot
Maggie Brewster (Betty Hutton), once voted the most popular girl in her class, has a successful real estate career, but regrets that she never married. When she runs into an old flame at the reunion (Dana Andrews), it looks as if the two might be meant for each other after all. However, Fred's aversion to commitment and Maggie's unwillingness to step out of her comfort zone threaten to kill their romance before it begins.

Cast

 Betty Hutton: Margaret 'Maggie' Brewster
 Dana Andrews: Fred Davis
 Jean Hagen: Barna Forrest
 Robert F. Simon: Harry Brewster
 Laura La Plante: May Brewster
 Gordon Jones: Jack Frazer
 Sara Berner: Paula Kratz
 Irene Ryan: Miss Stapleton
 Herbert Anderson: Edward
 Richard Shannon: Nick
 Ken Curtis: Al
 Vivi Janiss: Grace
 Mimi Doyle: Alice
 Florence Sundstrom: Mary
 James Gleason: Mr. 'Collie' Collyer (as Jimmy Gleason)
 Mary Kaye: Singer
 Richard Deacon: Sidney
 Don Haggerty: Pete
 Shirley Mitchell: Jane the Receptionist

Reception 
Writing in The New York Times, contemporary reviewer A. H. Weiler panned the film, saying, "Although it fleetingly captures the loneliness of some of its principals, it is largely a nostalgia-ridden and unimaginative comedy-drama that makes its points haltingly and without impact. Like the members of Carson High School's class of '41, 'Spring Reunion' tries desperately but fails to make its rosy dreams come alive."

References

External links
 
 
 
 

1956 drama films
1956 films
Bryna Productions films
Films directed by Robert Pirosh
United Artists films
American drama films
American black-and-white films
1950s English-language films
1950s American films